Hine-nui-te-pō ("Great woman of night") in Māori legends, is a goddess of night and she receives the spirits of humans when they die. She is the daughter of Tāne Mahuta / Tāne Tuturi and Hine-ahuone. It is believed among Māori that the colour red in the sky comes from her. Hine-nui-te-pō shepherds the wairua/souls into the first level of Rarohenga to ready them for the next stage of their journey. Before she was hine-nui-te-po her name was hine-ti-tama her father tane mahuta took her virginity she felt a shamed she hid herself in internal darkness to hide from her father and became hine-nui-te-po goddess of the night.

Background 
Hine-nui-te-pō, also known as the "Great Woman of Night" is a giant goddess of death and the underworld. Her father is Tāne, the god of forests and land mammals. Her mother is a human, Hine-ahu-one was made from earth. Hine-nui-te-pō is the second child of Tāne and Hine-ahu-one. Her birth name, Tikikapakapa, was changed shortly thereafter to Hine-au-tauria.

Hine-au-tauria marries her father Tāne and bears his children. She realizes he is her father, becomes ashamed, and goes down to the underground world, known as Pō ("darkness"). There, she becomes Hine-nui-te-pō, acquiring men's souls while her father Tāne tries to lead them to light.

Māui's encounter with Hine-nui-te-pō 
The great hero Māui is tricked by his father into thinking he has a chance to achieve immortality. In order to obtain this, Māui is told to enter into the goddess through her vagina. While Hine-nui-te-pō is asleep, Māui undresses himself ready to enter himself into the goddess. One of his bird friends, the fantail, warned Hinenui-te-po of the situation and woke her. As Māui turned into a worm squirming to enter the goddess, Hinenui-te-po decide to punish him, and crushed him with the obsidian teeth in her vagina; Māui was the first man to die.

See also

Māui (Māori mythology)
Vagina dentata
B.G. Biggs, 'Maori Myths and Traditions' in A. H. McLintock (editor), Encyclopaedia of New Zealand, 3 Volumes. (Government Printer: Wellington), 1966, II:447-454.

References 

Māori goddesses
Night goddesses
Death goddesses
Underworld goddesses
Māori underworld